The Scout and Guide movement in Grenada is served by two organisations
 The Girl Guides Association of Grenada, member of the World Association of Girl Guides and Girl Scouts
 The Scout Association of Grenada, member of the World Organization of the Scout Movement

See also